Stillwater, Nova Scotia may refer to:

 Stillwater, Guysborough, Nova Scotia in Guysborough County
 Stillwater, Hants, Nova Scotia in Hants County
 Stillwater Lake, Nova Scotia in the Halifax Regional Municipality